Hasloh is a municipality in the district of Pinneberg, in Schleswig-Holstein, Germany.

Geography
Hasloh is north of Hamburg, west of Norderstedt, and south of Quickborn.

Hasloh lies directly on the Bundesstraße 4. The A7 travels east of the town. The Hamburg-Altona–Neumünster railway travels through Hasloh. As a result, the town is connected to the HVV network.

References

Pinneberg (district)